Mortgagebot is an online mortgage-handling platform used by banks and credit unions. Mortgagebot is used by regulated banks and credit unions in the United States.

History
In 1997, Mortgagebot was formed as the mortgage subsidiary of M&I Bank. The bank's consumer-direct system for taking mortgage applications was originally developed to enable M&I's mortgage business to take advantage of the growth of the Internet.

In 2001, Mortgagebot was spun off from M&I Bank in a management-led buyout.

In April 2011, Davis + Henderson acquired Mortgagebot LLC for $231.8 million in cash.

In 2014, D+H Mortgagebot became D+H.  At that time, Mortgagebot was used by 1,400 banks and credit unions throughout the United States, originating over US$150 billion in mortgage applications annually.

In 2017, D+H merged with Misys to become Finastra.

Products
Direct: An online application, pricing, and approval program that personalizes the mortgage-application process based on borrower information and transaction type.

Advisor: A program that enables branch-based bank or credit-union associates to take accurate mortgage applications from borrowers.

Pro: A program designed to automate the mortgage-application process for professional loan officers.

Mobile: A program that enables mortgage lenders to deliver real-time mortgage-pricing information to consumers in an easy-to-understand format that is optimized for mobile devices.

Awards 

 Winner, Mortgage Technology magazine: “10X” Award (2001), “Synergy” Award (2002), “Lasting Impact” Award (2005)
 Repeat winner: Mortgage Technology magazine’s “Top Service Provider” Award (2005–2010)
 Inc. 500: America’s Fastest Growing Companies (2006)
 Repeat winner, Metro Milwaukee Association of Commerce (MMAC) “Future 50” Award (2005–07)
 Winner, Finovate 2007 “Best in Show” Award
 Winner, Milwaukee Magazine “Best Places to Work in Southeastern Wisconsin” Award (2008)
 Winner, Cornerstone Advisors’ “Walking the Vendor Walk” Award (2009)
 Designated “Hot Banking Tech Company to Watch in 2010” by Forrester Research
 Winner, Milwaukee Journal Sentinel “Top Workplace in Southeastern Wisconsin” Award (2010)
 Inc. 5000: America’s Fastest Growing Companies (2010)

References

External links 
 D+H US website

Financial software companies
Banking software companies
Financial services companies established in 1997
Software companies established in 1997